Metaclisis floridana is a species of parasitoid wasp in the family Platygastridae.

References

Further reading

 

Parasitic wasps
Articles created by Qbugbot
Insects described in 1887
Platygastridae